Mirković (meaning "son of "Mirko") is a Serbian and Croatian surname, and may refer to:

Borivoje Mirković (1884–1969), Yugoslav brigadier general
Čedomir Mirković (1944–2005), Serbian writer
Dragana Mirković (born 1968), Serbian pop-folk singer
DM SAT (Dragana Mirković Satelitska Televizija), Serbian cable/satellite music video and entertainment channel
Ivan Mirković (born 1987), Serbian footballer
Mijo Mirković "Mate Balota" (1898-1963), Croatian economist
Milan Mirković (born 1985), Serbian handballer
Miško Mirković (born 1966), Serbian footballer
Nikola Mirković (born 1991), Serbian football goalkeeper
Slađana Mirković (born 1995), Serbian volleyball player
Sreten Mirković (born 1958), Serbian boxer
Stojadin Mirković (1972–1991), Yugoslav soldier
Vlado Mirković (born 1975), Serbian-Montenegrin footballer
Zoran Mirković (born 1971), Serbian footballer

Serbian surnames
Croatian surnames